Herman William Belger (August 31, 1892 – April 3, 1971) was an American Negro league catcher in the 1910s.

A native of Bellefontaine, Missouri, Belger played for the Chicago Giants in 1914. He died in St. Louis, Missouri in 1971 at age 78.

References

External links
Baseball statistics and player information from Baseball-Reference Black Baseball Stats and Seamheads

1892 births
1971 deaths
Chicago Giants players
20th-century African-American sportspeople